Snyder's-Lance, Inc. is the second largest salty snack maker in the United States. It was formed by the 2010 merger of Lance Inc. and Snyder's of Hanover. The company is a subsidiary of the Campbell Soup Company.

History 
On September 6, 2012, Snyder's-Lance agreed to acquire Snack Factory for $312 million. Snyder's-Lance expected the acquisition to close early fourth quarter. On August 30, 2013, Snyder's-Lance acquired Stateline Service Corp. and no purchase price was disclosed. In 2016, Snyder's-Lance acquired Diamond Foods in a cash and stock merger transaction bringing Kettle Brand, Diamond of California, Pop-Secret and other snack brands under the Snyder's-Lance umbrella.  On December 18, 2017, the company announced it had entered to an agreement to accept Campbell Soup Company's offer to purchase the company. At time of the announcement, the purchase was valued at $4.9 billion. On January 18, 2023, Campbell Soup Company announced that the Campbell Snacks offices in Charlotte, North Carolina, and Norwalk, Connecticut, would be shut down with operations being consolidated at the company's headquarters in Camden, New Jersey.

References

External links
 

Companies based in Charlotte, North Carolina
Snack food manufacturers of the United States
Companies formerly listed on the Nasdaq
2018 mergers and acquisitions
Campbell Soup Company
Food and drink companies established in 2010
American companies established in 2010
2010 establishments in North Carolina